KSRW may refer to:

 KSRW (FM), a radio station (92.5 FM) licensed to Independence, California, United States
 KSRW-LP, a defunct low-power television station (channel 33) formerly licensed to Mammoth Lakes, California, United States